Alexandre Defaux (1826–1900) was a French artist. He was born in Bercy and studied under Jean-Baptiste-Camille Corot. He was a member of the Barbizon School.

List of Paintings
 Brassée de fleurs dans une jardinière
 Les Cerisiers en fleurs en Normandie
 Country Landscape with Flowering Trees
 Feeding Time
 In the Shelter of the Stack
 Intérieur de Paris.  Barricade de 1830
 Normandy Farm House
 Paysage en Normandie
 Poules pres d'un puits
 A Fishing Village

19th-century French painters
French male painters
1826 births
1900 deaths
Pont-Aven painters
19th-century French male artists